The Hawthornden Prize is a British literary award that was established in 1919 by Alice Warrender, who was born at Hawthornden Castle. Authors under the age of 41 are awarded on the quality of their "imaginative literature", which can be written in either poetry or prose. The Hawthornden Committee awards the Prize annually for a work published in the previous twelve months. There have been several gap years without a recipient (1945–57, 1959, 1966, 1971–73, and 1984–87).

Unlike other major literary awards, the Hawthornden does not solicit submissions. It is also universal in its coverage of the literary, welcoming fiction, travel writing, artistic and historical works.

The Hawthornden Prize, along with the James Tait Black Memorial Prizes, are Britain's oldest literary awards. Monetarily, it is modest: it offered £100 in 1936, in 1995 was worth £2000 and by 2017 had increased to £15,000. It is administered by the Hawthornden Trust set up by Warrender, and sponsored by the private trust of Drue Heinz.

Awards

See also 
 List of British literary awards

References

External links
 List of winners

English literary awards
Awards established in 1919
1919 establishments in England